Eugène 'Gène' Gerards (7 May 1940 − 2 January 2018) was a Dutch football player, manager and scout. As a player, Gerards played for Limburgian clubs SV Limburgia and Fortuna '54. As a manager, he spent the majority of his career in Greece, where he acquired citizenship and was a successful head coach for Cretan club OFI Crete for 15 years.

Playing career
Gène Gerards began his career at Limburgia as a defender-turned-striker in 1957. In 1963 he moved to Fortuna '54, before returning to Limburgia in 1967. He followed the club to amateur competitions in 1971 and retired in 1974. Gerards was a member of the Dutch national military team, as well as the Netherlands national under-21 football team. Despite being called-up for the Netherlands national football team by coach Denis Neville in 1964, Gerards made no senior national appearances.

Manager career

Roda JC
Still in his playing years, Gerards attended the German Sport University Cologne, earning various German managerial certificates. In 1974, he received his "Fußballehrer", highest professional football manager certificate in Germany, while working as municipality ambassador for Brunssum. Immediately after retirement as a player in May 1974, Gerards signed a contract as assistant manager for Dutch football club Roda JC, where he was also appointed head coach of the club's youth team. He held his position for the Kerkrade-based club for 12 years, serving under head coaches Bert Jacobs (1974–1980), Piet de Visser (1980–1983), Hans Eijkenbroek (1983–1984) and Frans Körver (1984–1986). During the last managerial change, Gerards replaced Eikenbroek as interim coach for a single game in December 1984, before returning to his post under arriving manager Frans Körver for the remainder of the 1984−85 season.

OFI Crete
At the start of the 1985−86 season, Gerards assumed his first job as head coach for an ambitious Greek Alpha Ethniki side OFI Crete, based in Heraklion, Crete. The club had recently been acquired by the rich and prestigious Vardinogiannis family, who also were the major shareholders of Athens-based regular Greek champions Panathinaikos.

At OFI Crete, Gerards set an outstanding record for both the club as well as Greek football in general, as he remained the team's head coach for 15 consecutive years, which to this day remains the longest managerial tenure in Greek football history. This feat was also paired with a string of successful domestic and European campaigns for the Cretan club, which constitute OFI Crete's "golden years". In 1986, OFI Crete finished in 2nd place in the Alpha Ethniki, trailing five points behind Panathinaikos, which still marks the best finish the club has ever made in the competition. In his first season with the club, Gerards had turned OFI Crete into a serious competitor for traditional Greek football "giants" Panathinaikos, AEK, Olympiacos and PAOK. In 1987, Gerards led the club to its first, and to this day only major honour, winning the Greek Football Cup in a penalty shoot-out vs. Iraklis Thessaloniki during the competition Final. He came close to repeat this feat in 1990, but OFI Crete were defeated in the Final by eventual Cup winners Olympiacos. During his 15 years with the club, Gerards qualified OFI six times for European competitions, winning one Balkans Cup in 1989, and advancing OFI through to the UEFA Cup Round of 16 during the 1993−94 edition of the competition, most notably eliminating Spanish club Atlético Madrid in the process.

During Gerards' tenure as head coach at OFI, several of the club's players were transferred out to prestigious European clubs. Among others, Gerards nurtured the talents of Nikos Machlas, Kostas Konstantinidis, Alexis Alexoudis, Dănuț Lupu, Yannis Anastasiou, Mahamadou Diarra, Kostas Kiassos and Ioannis Samaras.

The 1999−2000 season was his last as head coach at OFI. He was honored by the club for his longtime services, and was subsequently offered the position of chief scout and football advisor. However, in November 2000 he was surprisingly fired from his position, as the club's board of directors decided his presence was causing trouble for the club's new coach.

Later career
In January 2001, Gerards accepted the position of technical director at AEK Athens until the end of the season. He then revived his coaching career at Cypriot First Division side APOEL Nicosia, winning the Cypriot Championship in his first season with the club. He stayed at APOEL until 2002, and moved back to Greece as the new appointed manager of Alpha Ethniki side Iraklis Thessaloniki. After two seasons, Gerards decided in 2004 to retire as football manager and re-assumed his role as technical director and scout at AEK Athens, a position he held until 2009. He regularly organized football camps in Greece to discover new talents and has been linked to several key players to have emerged during his tenure as scout.

On 23 February 2010, Gerards revived his managerial career once more, taking over Panachaiki in the Gamma Ethniki, but left the club shortly after two months.

Personal life
Eugène was the son of Johanna Gerards-Dedroeg and Joep Gerards (1906–1986), a former Dutch footballer who played for various top-level Limburgian clubs during the 1920s and 1930s, as well as the president of SV Limburgia during 1946–1973. His brother Jo Gerards (1936–2014) was an amateur football manager, scout for Limburgia and sports journalist for the local newspaper. He has a younger sister Antoinette, who is a real football fan. Alongside his managerial certificates, Gerards had a certificate for retail, as well as a pilot's certificate. Gerards has a daughter from his first marriage and a son from his second marriage in the Netherlands. He married his third wife Katerina in 2004, and became a permanent resident of Crete. Characteristic of his love for Crete, he acquired Greek citizenship, and began his own winery "Geraldakis", a name he himself created and often used in public appearances by appending the common Cretan patronymic suffix -akis to his own Dutch surname.

Recognition
Gerards is recognized by many as one of the greatest managers in Greek football. He has been honored by the club where he made his name as a manager, OFI Crete on several occasions. A friendly game was held in his honor in 2000 at the club's home ground Theodoros Vardinogiannis Stadium, in which he later was offered a permanent, leather seat with his name engraved on it. In 2017 the club's board of directors decided to name the stadium's Gate 9 after him. On 20 November 2017, a special international friendly game was held to celebrate his service to the club in which Gerards' "children" (former Greek and foreign OFI Crete players during the years 1985–2000) played against some of the most recognized players in recent Greek football history (Gerards' "friends").

Health issues and death
Gerards first cited being plagued by health issues as the foremost reason for him retiring as manager in 2000 after 15 years of service at OFI Crete. In 2005, he was diagnosed with Progressive supranuclear palsy. His health had since deteriorated over the years, and by his mid-70s he was confined in a wheelchair. He died on 2 January 2018 aged 77. He is survived by his daughter Nathalie (1968) from his first marriage and son from his second marriage Frank (1981), his third wife Katerina and her two sons Manolis and Minas.

Managerial statistics

Honours

Managerial
OFI Crete
 Greek Football Cup (1): 1986–87

APOEL
 Cypriot First Division (1): 2001–02

Records
 OFI Crete all-time longest serving manager: 1985–2000.
 Hellenic Football Federation all-time longest serving manager in a single club: 1985–2000 (OFI Crete).

References

1940 births
2018 deaths
APOEL FC managers
Dutch football managers
Dutch footballers
Fortuna Sittard players
Iraklis Thessaloniki F.C. managers
OFI Crete F.C. managers
People from Brunssum
Roda JC Kerkrade managers
Expatriate football managers in Cyprus
Expatriate football managers in Greece
Super League Greece managers
Dutch expatriate football managers
Association football forwards
SV Limburgia players
Naturalized citizens of Greece
Footballers from Limburg (Netherlands)
Dutch expatriate sportspeople in Cyprus
Dutch expatriate sportspeople in Greece
AEK Athens F.C. non-playing staff
Netherlands under-21 international footballers
Roda JC Kerkrade non-playing staff
Panachaiki F.C. managers